Weronika Glinkiewicz (born 15 May 1977) is a Polish sailor. She competed in the Europe event at the 1996 Summer Olympics.

References

External links
 

1977 births
Living people
Polish female sailors (sport)
Olympic sailors of Poland
Sailors at the 1996 Summer Olympics – Europe
Sportspeople from Poznań